40 Seasons: The Best of Skid Row is a compilation album by American heavy metal band Skid Row, released in 1998. It includes the chart-topping singles "18 and Life", "I Remember You" and "Youth Gone Wild".

Content
The compilation features songs from the first three Skid Row studio albums Skid Row, Slave to the Grind and Subhuman Race. The tracks "Into Another", "My Enemy" and "Breakin' Down" were remixed for this album with more tender, slightly cleaner mixes, presumably so they fit more suitingly with the other tracks. It also includes two unreleased tracks, one from the 1988 Skid Row sessions, and one from the 1990-91 Slave to the Grind sessions. The Japanese version features a bonus track from the B-Side Ourselves EP.

Track listing

Personnel
 Sebastian Bach – lead vocals
 Dave Sabo – lead guitar, backing vocals
 Scotti Hill – rhythm guitar, backing vocals
 Rachel Bolan – bass, backing vocals
 Rob Affuso – drums, percussion

References

Skid Row (American band) albums
1998 greatest hits albums
Atlantic Records compilation albums